Calibre Press is a company that conducts training for law enforcement officers in the United States.

The organization is owned by a former police lieutenant who took the reins in 2012.

The company, which has trained more than one million officers nationwide over its 40-year history, offers training programs for Federal, State, Local and Tribal Law Enforcement. The topics of Calibre courses range from deescalation and strategic communication to leadership and emotional wellness.

Additionally, Calibre Press publishes a weekly newsletter for law enforcement and has released several training books. 

Calibre Press has worked with dozens of journalists, including National Public Radio, Minnesota Public Radio, Bloomberg, The New York Times, and dozens of local affiliates in an effort to increase public awareness of law enforcement issues.

In Popular Culture
Calibre Press' video output was brought to mainstream attention when two of its releases were featured in separate episodes of the Red Letter Media YouTube series Best of the Worst. Both Surviving Edged Weapons and Hostage Officer Survival were praised by the panel of reviewers for their macabre enjoyment value and the unusually high level of production quality they possessed compared to most educational videos. Specific kudos for these two Calibre Press productions went to the shocking and unexpected depictions of extreme violence that were juxtaposed against what the panel found to be genuinely educational content. Surviving Edged Weapons was deemed the superior entry of the two videos and was even found worthy enough by the Red Letter Media crew to be inducted into its Best of the Worst Hall of Fame.

References

Book publishing companies based in Illinois
Glen Ellyn, Illinois
Law enforcement in the United States